Alphonse Josef De Cuyper (1887–1950) was a Belgian sculptor and painter from Heverlee, Leuven.

In 1920, De Cuyper won a bronze medal in the art competitions of the Olympic Games for his Lanceur de Poids and for Coureur ("Shot Putter" and "Runner"). He also participated at the art competitions at the Games of 1928 and 1936.

References

Further reading
Engelen, C. & Marx, M., 2002: Beeldhouwkunst in België vanaf 1830, Algemeen Rijksarchief en Rijksarchief in de Provinciën. Studia 90, Brussel, pp. 860-862
Pas, W. & Pas, G., 2000: Biografisch lexicon plastische kunst in België. Schilders beeldhouwers grafici. 1830-2000 part 1 (A-J), Antwerpen, p. 217
Pas, W. & Pas, G., 2000: Dictionnaire biographique arts plastiques en Belgique. Peintres sculpteurs graveurs. 1800-2002 part 1 (A-D), Antwerpen, p. 287
Piron, P., 1999: De Belgische beeldende kunstenaars uit de 19de en 20ste eeuw part 1 (A-K), Brussel, p. 324
Vollmer, H., 1953: Allgemeines Lexikon der bildenden Künstler des XX. Jahrhunderts vol. 1 (A-D), Leipzig, p. 504 

1887 births
1950 deaths
Belgian painters
Olympic bronze medalists in art competitions
20th-century Belgian sculptors
Artists from Leuven
Medalists at the 1920 Summer Olympics
Olympic competitors in art competitions
Art competitors at the 1920 Summer Olympics
Art competitors at the 1928 Summer Olympics
Art competitors at the 1936 Summer Olympics